Alan Kellett (1937–2006) was an English former professional rugby league footballer who played in the 1950s, 1960s and 1970s, and coached in the 1960s and 1970s.

Background
Alan Kellett's birth was registered in Halifax, West Riding of Yorkshire, England.

Playing career

Early career
Kellett started his rugby league career as an amateur with Ovenden. In November 1954, he made two appearances for Halifax due to an injury to first choice  Ken Dean.

Oldham
Kellett was signed by Oldham in February 1955. He made his debut in March 1955 against Belle Vue Rangers.

Kellett played , and scored a try in Oldham's 2–12 victory over St. Helens in the 1958–59 Lancashire Cup Final during the 1958–59 season at Station Road, Swinton on Saturday 25 October 1958, in front of a crowd of 38,780.

Halifax
Kellett played in Halifax's 15–7 victory over St. Helens in the 1964–65 Championship Final during the 1964–65 season at Station Road, Swinton on Saturday 22 May 1965. In 1966, Kellett moved to Bradford Northern.

References

External links
 (archived by web.archive.org) Statistics at orl-heritagetrust.org.uk

Image  at rlhp.co.uk

Search for "Alan Kellett" at britishnewspaperarchive.co.uk
Search for "Allan Kellett" at britishnewspaperarchive.co.uk

1937 births
2006 deaths
Bradford Bulls players
English rugby league coaches
English rugby league players
Halifax R.L.F.C. players
Keighley Cougars captains
Keighley Cougars coaches
Keighley Cougars players
Oldham R.L.F.C. players
Rugby league five-eighths
Rugby league locks
Rugby league players from Halifax, West Yorkshire
Yorkshire rugby league team players